Bossiaea riparia, commonly known as river leafless bossiaea, is a species of flowering plant in the family Fabaceae and is endemic to south-eastern Australia. It is an erect or low-lying shrub with flattened branches, linear young cladodes, leaves mostly reduced to small scales, and yellow and red flowers.

Description

Taxonomy
Bossiaea riparia was first formally described in 1864 by George Bentham in Flora Australiensis from an unpublished description by Allan Cunningham. The specific epithet (riparia) means "frequenting the banks of rivers or streams".

Distribution and habitat
River leafless bossiaea grows in woodland and forest south from the Australian Capital Territory and the Southern Tablelands of New South Wales to scattered locations in Victoria and Tasmania.

References

riparia
Mirbelioids
Flora of New South Wales
Flora of the Australian Capital Territory
Flora of Victoria (Australia)
Flora of Tasmania
Taxa named by George Bentham
Plants described in 1864